Nashville, New York may refer to:

Nashville, a hamlet in Hanover, Chautauqua County, New York
Nashville, a hamlet in Wheatfield, Niagara County, New York